Davin White (born December 31, 1981) is an American professional basketball player for Venados de Mazatlán of the Liga Nacional de Baloncesto Profesional (LNBP).

High school
White played high school basketball at North High School, in Phoenix, Arizona.

College career
White played college basketball at Chandler–Gilbert CC, from 2001 to 2003. He then played at Cal State Northridge, with the Cal State Northridge Matadors, from 2003 to 2005.

Professional career
While playing with the Phoenix Hagen, White was the leading scorer of the German League 2012–13 season. In 36 games played, he averaged 17.2 points and 4.2 assists per game.

On September 12, 2013, he signed with Lukoil Academic of Bulgaria. He left them in December 2013. He then signed with Maccabi Rishon LeZion of Israel.

In October 2014, he signed with Spanish club La Bruixa d'Or Manresa.

White has also competed with Team 23, in The Basketball Tournament on ESPN. He was a point guard on the 2015 team that made it to the $1 million championship game, where they lost by a score of 67-65, to Overseas Elite.  In the summer of 2017, White averaged 16.0 points per game for Team 23.  He helped get Team 23 to the second round of the tournament, where they lost to Armored Athlete 84-77.

In 2015, White signs for the Spanish team Iberostar Tenerife winning the 2017 Basketball Champions League Final Four.

References

External links
Eurobasket.com Profile
RealGM profile
Euroleague.net Profile
FIBA.com Profile

1981 births
Living people
African-American basketball players
American expatriate basketball people in Bulgaria
American expatriate basketball people in Germany
American expatriate basketball people in Israel
American expatriate basketball people in Mexico
American expatriate basketball people in Serbia
American expatriate basketball people in Spain
American men's basketball players
Anaheim Arsenal players
Basketball players from Phoenix, Arizona
Bàsquet Manresa players
Cal State Northridge Matadors men's basketball players
CB Canarias players
Chandler–Gilbert Community College alumni
Colorado 14ers players
Halcones de Xalapa players
Halcones UV Córdoba players
Junior college men's basketball players in the United States
KK Lions/Swisslion Vršac players
Liga ACB players
Maccabi Rishon LeZion basketball players
PBC Academic players
Phoenix Hagen players
Venados de Mazatlán (basketball) players
Point guards
21st-century African-American sportspeople
20th-century African-American people
Libertadores de Querétaro players